Tony Abeyta (born November 6, 1965) is a contemporary Navajo Dine' artist living between Berkeley California and Santa Fe, New Mexico. Abeyta's work is most well known as mixed media paintings and oil landscapes of the American southwest. His subject matter include the New Mexico landscape, ancestral Navajo iconography and American Modernism

Early life and education 
Abeyta was born in Gallup, New Mexico to Navajo painter Narciso "Ciso" Platero Abeyta and Sylvia Ann, a Quaker ceramics artist. He was the youngest of seven children. 

He received an Associate of Fine Arts degree from the Institute of American Indian Arts in Santa Fe in 1986, where he received the T.C cannon memorial scholarship and later, an honorary doctorate of humanities. He earned a Bachelor of Fine Arts from the Maryland Institute College of Art in 1999 and a Master of Fine Arts from New York University in 2004. Aside from his homes in New Mexico and California, he has worked and studied in Baltimore, New York, Chicago, Florence, Italy, Venice, Italy, and the South of France.

Career 
Abeyta has lived and painted in both Santa Fe New Mexico and Berkeley, California. He has had numerous solo shows in Santa Fe and Sedona, Arizona, and has participated in multiple group shows in Santa Fe, Sedona, Los Angeles, California, and New York, New York.

His work has been included in the Smithsonian's National Museum of the American Indian, Washington D.C., Museum of Fine Arts, Boston, Museum of Contemporary Native Art, Santa Fe, New Mexico, Wheelwright Museum, Santa Fe, New Mexico, Museum of Indian arts and Culture Santa Fe, New Mexico, Philbrook Museum, Tulsa, Oklahoma, Heard Museum, Phoenix, Arizona, New Mexico Museum of Art, Santa Fe, New Mexico, Denver Art Museum, Denver, Colorado, Crocker Art Museum, Sacramento, California, Autry Museum of the American West, Los Angeles, California, the Eiteljorg Museum, Indianapolis Indiana.

His awards include the New Mexico Governor's Excellence in the Arts Award in 2012, the Native Treasures Living Treasure in 2012 by the Museum of Indian Arts and Culture, and the Gene Autry Memorial Award in 2018 from the Autry Museum of the American West.

References 

Navajo artists
1965 births
People from Gallup, New Mexico
Institute of American Indian Arts alumni
Maryland Institute College of Art alumni
New York University alumni
Living people